"Smoke on the Daughter" is the fifteenth episode of the nineteenth season of the American animated television series The Simpsons. It originally aired on the Fox network in the United States on March 30, 2008, and was written by Billy Kimball (the only sole writing credit he has received for the show to date), and directed by Lance Kramer. Lisa becomes a ballerina at an academy and discovers her natural talent is enhanced by second hand cigarette smoke. Meanwhile, Homer shows Bart his secret room where he has secretly been making beef jerky and is torn when a family of raccoons steal it. During the first broadcast, the episode was watched by 7.1 million people.

Plot
The episode starts when Homer, dressed as a dragon, tries waking up Bart to go with him, Lisa, Marge and Maggie to the midnight sale of the last book in the Angelica Button series.  The whole family then goes to stand in line (together with most of Springfield residents). At midnight Homer cannot wait; he bursts into the bookshop, followed by the rest of the people in the line. In the car on their way back home Lisa reads the book, announces there is a happy ending, and then the Simpsons throw the book away from the car. When they get back home, they decide to watch TV.

While watching TV, Marge sees a commercial for the Chazz Busby Ballet Academy, and reveals to Lisa that she had always wanted to become a ballet dancer. Lisa tells Marge that she can still achieve her dream as an adult, and encourages her to audition for the ballet academy. While Marge does stumble at first during her audition, she is able to prove herself as a talented dancer, and Busby lets her become a student at his school. Meanwhile, Homer takes Bart to the basement and introduces him to a secret room in which Homer has been making beef jerky. When Marge suffers a leg cramp during her dance routine, Busby throws her out. When Lisa argues with Busby about his decision, he notices that Lisa has naturally perfect posture, and asks her to join his academy, and Marge accepts the offer on Lisa's behalf. However, no matter how hard she practices, Lisa soon turns out to be a poor ballet student. While on break, Lisa accidentally inhales smoke from the other students' cigarettes. When the break is over, Lisa enters the studio and performs better than ever, and deduces that second hand smoke is what makes her excel.

Meanwhile, Homer and Bart offer to sell Apu their beef jerky to increase Kwik-E-Mart revenues despite Apu's Hinduism — but it is a lost cause, as Homer and Bart discover their beef jerky room is completely empty, and Apu leaves in frustration, refusing to do such business with them ever again. Homer discovers that a family of raccoons has made off with their jerky. That night, Lisa hallucinates of a cigarette-smoked shaped older version of herself, who convinces her to continue smoking. Lisa doubts the veracity of such a vision, until she is convinced by her feminist heroines by also seeing visions of them, all of whom were smokers. While driving Lisa to ballet practice, Marge — who is proud to have a ballerina as a daughter — starts glowing about how she sees herself in Lisa (even mistaking Lisa for herself), and Lisa starts suspecting that her mother's living her dream of being a ballerina through her.

Homer follows one of the raccoons into the family's home under a tree stump and prepares to take them out, despite Bart warning him that he always loses fights with animals, as his battle with the earthworms proved — but Homer claims that that was phased withdrawal, but after seeing that their family is basically the raccoon version of his family, Homer cannot bring himself to do it. During a windy break, Lisa cannot inhale any smoke. She realizes her only alternative is to actually smoke a cigarette, and picks one up. Right as she is about to smoke it, Homer arrives and takes it away, throws it on the ground, squishes it with his foot, and then shoots it with his gun several times. Appalled at his daughter's smoking, he goes to tell Marge that Lisa needs to be taken out of the ballet academy, but discovers how proud she is of Lisa; Homer cannot bear to destroy Marge's happiness. He does, however, order Lisa to quit smoking — including second hand — and has Bart keep an eye on her.

When Bart informs Homer that Lisa is still addicted to cigarette smoke, Homer creates a plan involving one of the raccoons. On the night of Lisa's ballet recital, which is Sleeping Beauty, the raccoon breaks into the changing room and steals all the cigarettes and money. On stage, all the ballerinas soon go out of control, and Lisa tells the annoyed audience that ballet is something America has forced onto children, and quits (although she implied that she was going to talk about smoking, which was the main message of this episode, she states that she takes full responsibility for her decision to smoke instead of the usual "blame tobacco companies"), prompting Busby to also quit. Lisa finally manages to overcome her smoke addiction using children's 'Hello Kitty' nicotine patches. Marge also learns her lesson: parents should not try to achieve their dreams through their children, but Homer proves that he has yet to learn that moral, as he is forcing Bart to become a Mexican wrestler called El Guapo, which means "good looking" in Spanish.

Cultural references
The couch gag is a parody of the 1949-1966 Warner Bros. Wile E. Coyote and Road Runner cartoons directed by Chuck Jones.
The opening Angelica Button segment is a parody of the fanfare surrounding the Harry Potter series. It is stated that this is the final Angelica Button book, whereas the final book, Harry Potter and the Deathly Hallows, was released in 2007.
Chazz Busby is designed to resemble the character Joe Gideon (a choreographer) played by Roy Scheider in the film All That Jazz (1979), and his name is taken from Chazz Young and Busby Berkeley, both choreographers.
When Bart emerges from the dumpster, eavesdropping on Lisa to see if she's smoking, his face is camouflaged and "The End" by The Doors plays in the background. This is a parody of the scene in Apocalypse Now in which Willard emerges from the water camouflaged, about to kill Colonel Kurtz, with the same music playing.
The title itself is a reference to the song "Smoke on the Water" by Deep Purple.

Reception
The episode was watched by 7.10 million people; the number is not considered to be accurate, as the episode was broadcast on a special time (according to commercials).

Richard Keller of TV Squad stated that he enjoyed the week's episode, but commented that it "wasn't as strong as the previous two." Robert Canning of IGN thought that the episode was good and that it "started off very, very strongly" but commented that it seemed to lose its comedic pace as it progressed. He particularly enjoyed the episode's couch gag, stating that "It was a great reminder of the early, innocent days of cartoon comedy but with a modern Simpsons twist". He gave the episode a 7.2/10.

References

External links 
 

The Simpsons (season 19) episodes
2008 American television episodes